Minuscule 196 (in the Gregory-Aland numbering), Zε23 (Soden), is a Greek minuscule manuscript of the New Testament, on parchment. Palaeographically it has been assigned to the 12th century. It has marginalia.

Description 

The codex contains a complete text of the four Gospels on 369 thick parchment leaves (size ). The text is written in one column per page, 44 lines per page, biblical text in red, commentary's text in black ink.

The text of Matt 15:10-17:22 is written on paper, in 27 lines per page. The biblical text is surrounded by a catena. The biblical text is written in red ink, the catena text in black.

Text 

The Greek text of the codex is a representative of the Byzantine text-type. Aland placed it in Category V.
It was not examined by the Claremont Profile Method.

History 

The manuscript once belonged to Lorenzo de Midicis, who presented it in 1473 to the Convent of S. Marco de Florentia des Predigerordens.

It was examined by Bianchini, Birch, Scholz, and Burgon. C. R. Gregory saw it in 1886.

It is currently housed at the Laurentian Library (Plutei. VIII. 12), at Florence.

See also 

 List of New Testament minuscules
 Biblical manuscript
 Textual criticism

References

Further reading 

 

Greek New Testament minuscules
12th-century biblical manuscripts